Bolton Field  is a public airport in Columbus, in Franklin County, Ohio, United States. It is a towered airport operated under the Columbus Regional Airport Authority. It is one of 12 general aviation reliever airports in Ohio recognized in the National Plan of Integrated Airport Systems (NPIAS) and is a reliever airport for John Glenn Columbus International Airport.

Most U.S. airports use the same three-letter location identifier for the FAA and IATA, but Bolton Field is TZR to the FAA and has no IATA code.

History
Bolton Field opened on October 24, 1970, a day after Franklin County Common Pleas Court rejected a move by a nearby private airport (located on Darby Dan Farm) to stop it. Major Harry Charles Davidson, a WWII veteran residing in Groveport, Ohio, was the first airport manager at Bolton Field. Major Harry Charles Davidson was appointed by Mayor of Columbus, Jack Sensenbrenner. The airport is named after long-time Port Columbus International Airport Superintendent Francis A. "Jack" Bolton, honored posthumously when the city dedicated the airfield to him at its opening. The airport was built to handle personal and business aviation, freeing Port Columbus for commercial traffic.

In 1980, the operation of John Glenn International Airport (formerly Port Columbus International Airport) and Bolton Field Airport was transferred from the City of Columbus to the Columbus Airport Authority; in 2003, the Columbus Airport Authority and the Rickenbacker Port Authority merged to create the Columbus Regional Airport Authority, which manages John Glenn Columbus International (CMH), Rickenbacker International Airport (LCK) and Bolton Field (TZR) airports.

Facilities and aircraft

Facilities
Fuel is available; planes can use tiedowns or hangars for parking.

Capital City Jet provides flight instruction, fixed-base operations, and air charter services.

Columbus State Community College has an Aviation Maintenance Training Program on the field. 

Scioto Valley 99s and Central Ohio Balloon Club are aviation organizations located on the grounds.

Aircraft
In the year ending June 21, 2011, the airport had 74,511 aircraft operations, average 204 per day: 57% local general aviation, 43% transient general aviation <1% air taxi and <1% military. 82 aircraft are based at this airport: 90% single engine, 6% multi-engine, 2% jet and 1% helicopter.

Incidents and accidents 
 On June 18, 1993, upon approach for landing on grass runway 22, a Glasflügel H-101 glider registered N101AZ, encountered a powered airplane, which had entered the landing pattern. The pilot extended his base leg to the approach to accommodate the aircraft. He then decided that it would be difficult to complete the landing on the planned runway, so he switched to a site he was unfamiliar with. During this landing, the glider impacted a ditch. The ultra-light aircraft suffered damage to its tail section.

References

External links 

 
 Capital City Jet Center (fixed-base operator)
 
 

Buildings and structures in Columbus, Ohio
Airports in Ohio
Transportation in Columbus, Ohio
Transportation buildings and structures in Franklin County, Ohio